A banker provides financial banking services and typically works in a bank. The word may also refer to:
 Banker (ancient), a person providing financial services in ancient Greece and Rome
 Banker (surname), a surname
 Bank engine or helper engine, a locomotive that helps other engines up steep hills
 Bankers (train), American passenger train
 The Banker, an international financial affairs publication
 The Banker (Deal or No Deal UK), the antagonist on the British game show Deal or No Deal
 "The Banker" (The Office), an episode of the sixth season of the American television show The Office
 The Bankers, 1975 book by Martin Mayer
 The Banker (2015 film), a Nigerian drama film
 The Banker (2020 film), an American drama film
 Banker (horse), an Australian racehorse, winner of the 1863 Melbourne Cup
 Banker (card player), the player who controls the play in a gambling game 
 The Banker (TV series), a 2019 South Korean television series

See also
Bank (disambiguation)
Bancker (disambiguation)
Baker (disambiguation)